Maddaloni is a town and comune of Campania, Italy, in the province of Caserta, about  southeast of Caserta, with stations on the railways from Caserta to Benevento and from Caserta to Naples.

Main sights
The city is at the base of one of the Tifata hills, the towers of its medieval castle and the Church of San Michele crowning the heights above. The fine old palace of the Caraffa family (once dukes of Maddaloni), the old college now named after Giordano Bruno, and the institute for the sons of soldiers are the chief points of interest.

The Gothic church of Santa Margherita has a series of 15th-century frescoes by the Florentine painter Giovanni Balducci. The church of the Annunziata has a series of early 17th century paintings that decorate the rich wooden ceiling. Many of the works were patronized by the local feudal lords, the Carafa family.

The town has two museums, the  Museo Civico and the Museo Archeologico, which contains pre-Roman tombs and objects from the ancient city of Calatia.

There are many important schools in Maddaloni. The "Convitto Nazionale Giordano Bruno" is the oldest public secondary school in the province of Caserta. It was founded in 1807 in the former Franciscan convent. The great hall has a ceiling, which is decorated with the largest canvas painting in the world spanning .
 
The "Villaggio dei Ragazzi" was originally a school for orphans founded in 1947 by local priest Don Salvatore D'Angelo. The private school has become an important centre of learning in the province and has been run by the religious order The Legion of Christ since its founder died in 2000.

Giulietta Sacco was born here in 1944 and continued to live here, is a prominent interpreter of Neapolitan songs in the late 1960s and 1970s. 

It was built to convey the water of the Taburno to Caserta across the valley between Monte Longano and Monte Gargano.

References

References

Cities and towns in Campania